The 1993 Scheldeprijs was the 80th edition of the Scheldeprijs cycle race and was held on 21 April 1993. The race was won by Mario Cipollini.

General classification

References

1993
1993 in road cycling
1993 in Belgian sport